Park Hyeon-gon (born 19 February 1968) is a South Korean former cyclist. He competed in two events at the 1988 Summer Olympics.

References

1968 births
Living people
South Korean male cyclists
Olympic cyclists of South Korea
Cyclists at the 1988 Summer Olympics
Place of birth missing (living people)